Among the recipients of the honorary citizenship of Paris are:

 Íngrid Betancourt - Colombian politician who was kidnapped in 2001.
 Gilad Shalit - Israeli soldier who was kidnapped in 2006 by Palestinian militants and held by Hamas.
 Mumia Abu-Jamal - African-American who was convicted and sentenced to death for the 1981 murder of police officer Daniel Faulkner. Before his arrest he was a Black Panther Party activist and journalist.
 Raoni Metuktire - chief of the Kayapo people, which live in the Amazon rainforest on the territory of Brazil.
 Aung San Suu Kyi - Burmese opposition politician and chairperson of the National League for Democracy (NLD) in Burma.
 Taslima Nasrin - Bangladeshi author and human rights campaigner.
 Charlie Hebdo - French satirical weekly newspaper, whose employees were killed during the Islamist terrorist attack on 7 January 2015.
 Oleg Sentsov - Ukrainian filmmaker who is serving a 20-year prison sentence in Russia since 2015.
 Winston Churchill - British prime minister during WWII (received the honour 12 November 1944)
 Luiz Inácio Lula da Silva - President of Brazil between 2003 and 2010.

References

Paris, Honorary citizens of
Paris
Honorary citizens
Culture of Paris
Honorary citizens of Paris